The Yale romanizations are four romanization systems created at Yale University for the following four East Asian languages:

 Yale romanization of Mandarin, developed in 1943 by the Yale sinologist George Kennedy.
 Yale romanization of Cantonese, developed by Gerard P. Kok and published in 1958.
 Yale romanization of Korean, developed by Samuel Elmo Martin and his colleagues at Yale University around 1942 about half a decade after McCune–Reischauer. It is the standard romanization of the Korean language in linguistics. 
 JSL romanization, a system for Japanese devised by Eleanor Jorden, which is sometimes called "Yale romanization".

Romanization